V14 may refer to:

 V14 engine, a class of engine
 V14, a grade in bouldering
 V14, a personal history of allergy to medicinal agents, in the ICD-9 V codes
 Fokker V.14, an experimental aircraft